RFA Brambleleaf (A81) was a  small tanker of the Royal Fleet Auxiliary.

RFA Brambleleaf was built by Furness Shipbuilding Company of Stockton-on-Tees. She was launched as the civilian London Loyalty for London & Overseas Freighters in 1953 and completed on 8 January 1954. She was a sister ship of  built by the same shipyard for LOF the following year.

She was bareboat chartered for the RFA in 1959 and renamed RFA Brambleleaf. She was returned to her owners in 1972, who transferred her to their Mayfair Tankers subsidiary and registered her in Liberia as the Mayfair Loyalty.

On 9 September 1974 she was laid up at La Spezia, Italy. On 27 February 1976 she was sold for scrap, and demolition began in La Spezia in July of that year.

References

Sources and further reading

External links

 

Tankers of the United Kingdom
Ships of London and Overseas Freighters
Tankers of the Royal Fleet Auxiliary
Leaf-class tankers
1954 ships
Ships built on the River Tees